HMS Christopher was an  (also known as the K class) of the British Royal Navy. She was built by Hawthorn Leslie in 1911–1912. She served throughout the First World War, forming part of the Grand Fleet until 1916 and taking part in the Battle of Jutland. Later in the war she served in the English Channel to protect merchant shipping against attacks by German U-boats. Christopher was sold for scrap in May 1921.

Construction and design
Christopher was one of three s ordered by the British Admiralty from the Hawthorn Leslie shipyard under the 1911–1912 shipbuilding programme, with a total of 20 Acastas (12, including Christopher to the standard Admiralty design and eight more as builder's specials).

The Acastas were larger and more powerful than the s ordered under the previous year's programme. Greater speed was wanted to match large fast destroyers building for foreign navies, while a larger radius of action was desired. Displacement was  Normal and  Deep load.

Four Yarrow water-tube boilers fed steam to Parsons steam turbines which drove two propeller shafts. Three funnels were fitted.

Armament consisted of three  guns mounted on the ship's centreline, with one forward and two aft, and two  torpedo tubes.  Two reload torpedoes were carried. The ship had a crew of 73 officers and ratings. One of Christophers 4-inch guns was modified in 1916 to a high-angle mounting for anti-aircraft fire. This gun, together with both torpedo tubes, were removed in April 1918 to accommodate depth charges and paravanes.

Christopher was laid down at Hawthorn Leslie's Hebburn shipyard on 16 October 1911, and was launched on 28 August 1912. In 1913 the Admiralty decided to reclassify the Royal Navy's destroyers into alphabetical classes, with the Acasta class becoming the K class. New names were allocated to the ships of the K class, with the name Kite being reserved for Christopher, but the ships were not renamed. Christopher reached a speed of  during sea trials. She was completed in November 1912.

Service
On commissioning, Christopher joined the 4th Destroyer Flotilla.

At the outbreak of the First World War, Christopher, along with the rest of the 4th Flotilla, joined the newly established Grand Fleet, based at Scapa Flow. In February 1915, Christopher was one of a number of Grand Fleet destroyers ordered to escort merchant ships carrying troops of the 1st Canadian Division from Avonmouth to St Nazaire. Owl, Contest and Christopher ran aground while attempting to turn in the narrow approach channel, remaining aground until the next day. Christopher was repaired on the Clyde.

On 8 August 1915 Christopher was on patrol on the Moray Forth when the steamer  was attacked by the German submarine . Christopher, responding to reports of the attack, reached the incident as Glenravel was sinking, and then spotted a submarine in the vicinity of another merchant ship, the Swedish . Christopher opened fire on the submarine, which dived away, but the destroyer could not stop Malmland being sunk by U-17. On 23 September Christopher collided with the armed boarding steamer , damaging the destroyer. On 3 January 1916 Christopher and Contest set out from Scapa to meet up with battleship , on passage from Belfast, and escort her into Scapa. Poor weather forced the two destroyers to seek shelter at Stornoway, however, and Africa reached Scapa without escort.

Christopher was present at the Battle of Jutland on 31 May/1 June 1916. Although Shark was sunk and Acasta badly damaged in a clash with German light cruisers and torpedo boats, Christopher, which fired 30 shells in the battle, was undamaged, with none of her crew injured.

In July 1916, the 4th Flotilla left the Grand Fleet, moving to the Humber to counter German minelayers and to protect British minesweepers in the North Sea. The flotilla, including Christopher, moved again to Portsmouth in November that year. The 4th Flotilla was transferred to Devonport in spring 1917. Regular convoy operations on the North Atlantic route began in July 1917, with the destroyers of the 4th Flotilla being used as escorts to escort incoming convoys through the dangerous Western Approaches.

At the end of the war, all pre-war destroyers were quickly withdrawn from active service, and Christopher was sold for scrap on 9 May 1921.

Notes

Citations

References

External links 

 Battle of Jutland Crew Lists Project - HMS Christopher Crew List

 

Acasta-class destroyers
World War I destroyers of the United Kingdom
1912 ships